This is a list of Sri Lankan cricket teams who have played all forms of the game, past and present.

Franchise teams

 Colombo Stars
 Dambulla Aura
 Galle Gladiators
 Jaffna Kings
 Kandy Falcons

Club teams

Current major clubs

These are the clubs with current first-class, List A and Twenty20 status who are playing in Sri Lanka's major tournaments: the SLC Major League Tournament, the SLC Major Clubs Limited Overs Tournament, and the SLC Major Clubs T20 Tournament.
 Ace Capital Cricket Club (formerly Seeduwa Raddoluwa Cricket Club to 2011 and Sri Lanka Ports Authority Cricket Club to 2020)
 Badureliya Sports Club
 Bloomfield Cricket and Athletic Club
 Burgher Recreation Club
 Chilaw Marians Cricket Club
 Colombo Cricket Club
 Colts Cricket Club
 Galle Cricket Club
 Kalutara Town Club
 Kandy Customs Cricket Club
 Kurunegala Youth Cricket Club
 Lankan Cricket Club
 Moors Sports Club
 Negombo Cricket Club
 Nondescripts Cricket Club
 Nugegoda Sports and Welfare Club
 Panadura Sports Club
 Police Sports Club
 Ragama Cricket Club
 Saracens Sports Club
 Sebastianites Cricket and Athletic Club
 Sinhalese Sports Club
 Sri Lanka Air Force Sports Club
 Sri Lanka Army Sports Club
 Sri Lanka Navy Sports Club
 Tamil Union Cricket and Athletic Club

Former first-class clubs
 Antonians Sports Club (first-class 1991–92 to 2002–03, and in 2010–11)
 Kalutara Physical Culture Centre (first-class in 2016–17)
 Kandy Cricket Club (first-class 2001 to 2007)
 Kandy Youth Cricket Club (first-class in 1991–92)
 Kurunegala Sports Club (first-class in 1992–93)
 Matara Sports Club (first-class 1997 to 2001)
 Nomads Sports Club (extinct; last first-class in 1995)
 Old Cambrians Sports Club (first-class in 1991–92)
 Rio Sports Club (first-class in 2001–02)
 Seeduwa Raddoluwa Cricket Club (became Sri Lanka Ports Authority Cricket Club in 2011)
 Singha Sports Club (first-class 1989 to 2011)
 Sri Lanka Ports Authority Cricket Club (became Ace Capital Cricket Club in 2020)
 Sri Lanka Schools (first-class 2001 to 2003) 

Some of these clubs continue to field teams, but at sub-first-class level.

Provincial teams

A former first-class tournament in which the following teams participated:

 Basnahira North cricket team (1992–2003, 2008–2010)
 Basnahira South cricket team (1992–2003, 2008–2010)
 Kandurata cricket team (1990–2010)
 Nagenahira cricket team (2010)
 North Central Province cricket team (2004–2005)
 Ruhuna cricket team (1990–2010)
 Sri Lanka Cricket Combined XI (2010)
 Sri Lanka Schools XI cricket team (2008–2009)
 Uthura cricket team (2010)
 Uva cricket team (2004, 2010)
 Wayamba cricket team (1990–2010)
 Western Province City cricket team (1991–1992)
 Western Province Suburbs cricket team (1991–1992)
 Western Province (1990–1991, 2003–2004)

Sri Lankan cricket teams
Teams